Babille is a woreda in the Somali Region of Ethiopia. Part of the Fafan Zone, Babille is bordered on the west by the Oromia Region, on the north by Gursum, and on the east and south by Fiq Zone. Information about the towns in this woreda is not available.

Demographics 
Based on the 2007 Census conducted by the Central Statistical Agency of Ethiopia (CSA), this woreda has a total population of 77,317, of whom 41,629 are men and 35,688 women. While 1,273 or 1.65% are urban inhabitants, a further 17,533 or 22.68% are pastoralists. 99.29% of the population said they were Muslim. This woreda is inhabited by the Karanle Hawiye, and Babille Oromo Somali groups.

The 1994 national census reported a total population for this woreda of 93,527, of whom 48,436 were men and 45,091 were women; the census identified no urban inhabitants. The largest ethnic group reported in Babille was the Somali people (99.97%).

Notes 

Districts of Somali Region